The Lambya, also known as the Nkoya, are an ethnic and linguistic group based along the border of northwestern Malawi and in Momba District of Mbeya Region, Tanzania. A minority also exists in Zambia. In 2001 the Lambya population was estimated to number 85,000, including 45,000 in Malawi and 40,000 (from a 1987 estimate) in Tanzania.

Location 

In Malawi, most are found within the traditional Authority Mwaulambia and Mweni Kameme. Chitipa district is the north most district in northern region of Malawi (formerly known as Forthill during the colonial times). The present name Chitipa means big mud (I-chitope).

Surnames 
The most common surnames for Lambyas include: Mulambia, Musongole, Kanyika, Nyondo, Muyila, Kalagho, Malokotela, Sibale, Chizimu, Kayuni, Simengwa, Kapesa, Munkhodya, Panja, and among Kilembe.Malanga

Language 
The people speak Lambya (ichilambya).  Nouns often start with 'i' or 'u'.

For further information on the language, and a short text ('The Hare and the Tortoise'), see the external link below to the Language Mapping Survey for Northern Malawi, p. 62.

The Establishment and Expansion of the Lambya Kingdom 
Lambya kingdom, a small polity in Chitipa District, which forms the northernmost tip of the modern Republic of Malawi. It was a small political unit but nevertheless historically important because its inhabitants belong to a larger cluster of peoples hereafter referred to as the Ngulube group, which comprises Safwa, Bena, Kinga, Nyakyusa and Ndali of southern Tanzania and the Sukwa and Ngonde of Malawi. Ideally the traditions of all these peoples should be correlated for a fuller understanding of what constitutes one historical area. The article discusses four main themes: the problem of sources, the establishment of the Lambya state, its relations with its neighbors and its early territorial expansion.

Ulambya, as the country of the Lambya is called, covers an area of 367 square miles and has a population of roughly 20 thousand people with an average density of 36 persons per square mile, the largest concentration being in the more fertile valleys of Kaseye, and the Songwe (Stobbs and Young, 1972: 40; Young and Brown, 1972: 30). The Lambya share a border to the north with the Ndali of Tanzania and the Nyiha on the west with the Namwanga of Zambia, on the south with the Fungwe, Tambo and the Tumbuka-speaking peoples of Mwenewenya, and on the east with the Sukwa. The Lambya are worthy of attention for a number of reasons. Ulambya is one of the oldest states in the area and the dating of its regnal list should assist in the problem of working out a chronology of the Ngulube group. A study of the Lambya should also contribute to an understanding of the problems that attended the early development of small polities and give the Lambya a proper place in the early history of the wider zone.

Culture 
The people are very hospitable, usually they slaughter a chicken as part of welcoming a visitor.  Most would be offended if a person refused to have a meal with them, if one insists that they are satisfied, the best approach is to eat very little.  Complete refusal to eat their food might give them a picture that you are stingy so you yourself want them also to refuse to eat when they visit you or you suspect that they may have included medicine in the food (Ukukutegha).

It is cultural to quickly prepare ubughali, that is thick porridge made from maize flour eaten with relish, for a visitor so that they should replenish the energy.  Normally food is eaten after washing hands from a common dish (elderly wash first in the order of age) all the participants will eat from the same plate.  It is expected that the elder should stop eating where a small piece of food remains for the younger children at the table. Evening Left-overs are a delicacy the next morning especially when the relish is boiled beans. Lambya people also cherish gourd (akapale) soured milk.

Burial Rites

Death among the Lambya traditional is respected. Whenever death takes place whether of a man, woman, or a Child a series of funeral rites lasting a month or more begins. The first of the series is the burial (Kusyira umuvimba) which in the case of most adults last three or four days, though for rich man it may continue for a week and for a child it is over in a day.

As soon as death occurs most of the time women who are present begins wailing and messages are sent to the chiefs, the village headman and dead mans kinsmen and affine to announce the fact and bid them to the burial. The first message is sent to the father or to a senior brother or sister if one is still alive or calling them to heir of the dead person. The fact about the dead man is announced in the village by the chief, who usually get the consent to do so from the deceased family. In sending the passage to the chief the deceased family also asks the chief permission of a drum which is kept by the chief. This drum is used to send message further in the village and it acts a symbol of funeral. The drumming of the drum has got its rhythm that tells the people about the funeral as result they easily differentiate the funeral and the entertainment drum styles. To get all these permission the deceased family basically presents a hen or cock to the chief (umwene) and then the message spread.

References

External links 
 "Ethnologue languages of the world".
 University of Malawi Centre for Language Studies (2006). "Language Mapping Survey for Northern Malawi".
Davie Moses Simengwa. 2017. The Lambya Traditions; Customs, Beliefs, Ritual, Dances and Rites. LAP LAMBERT Academic Publishing. Mauritius.

Ethnic groups in Malawi
Ethnic groups in Tanzania
Ethnic groups in Zambia
Indigenous peoples of East Africa